Kvemo Okrokana (literally — "Lower Golden Field") is a village in the historical region of Khevi, north-eastern Georgia. It is located on the left bank of the river Tergi. Administratively, it is part of the Kazbegi Municipality in Mtskheta-Mtianeti. It is 25 km from the municipality center of Stepantsminda.

Sources 
 Georgian Soviet Encyclopedia, V. 10, p. 515, Tbilisi, 1986 year.

References

Kobi Community villages